August Bodo Wilhelm Clemens Paul von Trott zu Solz (29 December 1855 – 27 October 1938) was a German politician.

Born in Hesse-Kassel (or Hesse-Cassel) into the noble Trott zu Solz family, he became Minister of Culture of the Kingdom of Prussia from 1909 to 1917, playing a leading role in the founding of the Kaiser Wilhelm Society.

He was the father of Adam von Trott zu Solz.

He died in Nassau, Germany.

Sources
 Thomas Klein: Leitende Beamte der allgemeinen Verwaltung in der preußischen Provinz Hessen-Nassau und in Waldeck 1867 bis 1945 (= Quellen und Forschungen zur hessischen Geschichte. Vol.70), Hessische Historische Kommission Darmstadt, Historische Kommission für Hessen, Darmstadt/Marburg 1988, pg.225.
 
 Jochen Lengemann: MdL Hessen. 1808–1996. Biographischer Index (= Politische und parlamentarische Geschichte des Landes Hessen. Vol.14 = Veröffentlichungen der Historischen Kommission für Hessen. Vol.48, 7). Elwert, Marburg 1996, pp. 384–385.
 Bernhard Mann: Biographisches Handbuch für das preußische Abgeordnetenhaus. 1867–1918 (= Handbücher zur Geschichte des Parlamentarismus und der politischen Parteien. Vol.3). Droste, Düsseldorf 1988, pp. 390 f.

1855 births
1938 deaths
People from the Electorate of Hesse
Members of the Prussian Academy of Sciences
Members of the Prussian House of Representatives
August
Education ministers of Prussia